Transatlantic relations refer to the historic, cultural, political, economic and social relations between countries on both side of the Atlantic Ocean.  Sometimes it specifically means relationships between the Anglophone North American countries (the United States and Canada), and particular European countries or organizations, although other meanings are possible.

There are a number of issues over which the United States and Europe generally disagree.  Some of these are cultural, such as the U.S. use of the death penalty, some are international issues such as the Middle East peace process where the United States is often seen as pro-Israel and where Europe is often seen as pro-Arab (or at least neutral), and many others are trade related. The current U.S. policies are often described as being unilateral in nature, whereas the European Union and Canada are often said to take a more multilateral approach, relying more on the United Nations and other international institutions to help solve issues. There are many other issues upon which they agree.

Definition

Transatlantic relations can refer to relations between individual states or to relations between groups of states or international organizations with other groups or with states, or within one group.
For example:
Within a group:
 Intra-NATO relations
e.g. Canada–NATO relations
Between groups:
EU - North American Free Trade Agreement (NAFTA) relations
European Free Trade Area (EFTA) - NAFTA relations
Transatlantic Free Trade Area (theoretical)
CARIFORUM - European Commission (Economic Partnership Agreements)
Between a group and a state:
Canada–European Union relations
United States–European Union relations
Canada - EFTA Free Trade Agreement 
Between states:
Germany–United States relations
Canada–France relations, etc.

By language and culture
Commonwealth of Nations
Community of Portuguese Language Countries
Dutch Union
La Francophonie
Latin Union
The boundaries of which states are part of Transatlantic relations depends on the context. The term may be used as a euphemism to a specific bilateral relationship, for example, Anglo-American relations. The boundary could be drawn so as only to refer member states of the EU plus the US, when discussing Euro-American relations.  In other circumstances it may include Canada, or non-EU countries in Europe. The term may also be used in the context of the wider Atlantic world including Africa and Latin America.

History

The early relationship between Europe and America was based on colonialism and mercantilism.  The majority of modern states in the Americas can be traced back to colonial states that were founded by European nations, states that were very different from the pre-Columbian civilizations and cultures that had existed before.

Even after the United States (and later Canada) became independent, the main relationship between the two continents was one-way migration.

Politically the United States tried to keep a distance from European affairs, and Canada was subordinate to British foreign policy.

During the First World War however both North American states found themselves fighting in Europe and engrossed in European politics.  President Woodrow Wilson's Fourteen Points helped to redraw the map of Europe.

Although the Roosevelt administration wanted to enter the war against Germany, the vast majority of Americans were too isolationist and disillusioned at their experience in World War I to seek involvement in the World War II, at least until the U.S. was attacked by Japan at Pearl Harbor on December 7, 1941, and Adolf Hitler declared war on the United States on December 11, 1941.  Once involved, the US became pivotal to the war effort and therefore European politics.

After the second war the United States and Canada both desired a permanent role in the defence of Europe, and European states wanted protection from the Soviet Union.  The result was the North Atlantic Treaty Organization, which became the lynchpin of Transatlantic relations during the Cold War.

Atlanticism is a philosophy which advocates for close cooperation between North America and Europe.

See also
 Atlanticism
 Atlantic Community
 Atlantic Council
Atlantic history
 United States–European Union relations
 European Union–NATO relations
 German Marshall Fund
 South Atlantic Peace and Cooperation Zone
 Transatlantic Economic Council
 Transatlantic Free Trade Area (TAFTA)
 Canada–European Union relations
 Canada–NATO relations
 Western World

References

External links 
 Center for Transatlantic Relations

Bibliography

 Jussi M. Hanhimaki, Benedikt Schoenborn and Barbara Zanchetta, "Transatlantic Relations since 1945. An Introduction", Routledge, London, 2012.

External links

 A stronger EU-US Partnership and a more open market for the 21st century
European Union Institute for Security Studies: The Obama Moment - European and American Perspectives
Atlantic Council of the U.S.: Transatlantic Cooperation Against Terrorism
Atlantic Council publications on transatlantic economics, security, and politics
"The Invisible Pillar of Transatlantic Cooperation: Activating Untapped Science & Technology Assets," Science & Diplomacy
R. Nicholas Burns, Under Secretary of State for Political Affairs, called on the U.S. and Europe to embrace common purpose around an ambitious global agenda that would redefine its mission for the 21st Century.

 
United States–European relations
Third-country relations of the European Union
Canada–Europe relations
Relations